Land Ordinance may refer to the following acts passed by the Congress of the Confederation of the United States:

 Land Ordinance of 1784
 Land Ordinance of 1785
 Land Ordinance of 1787, commonly known as the Northwest Ordinance, that created the Northwest Territory

See also
 Ordinance (disambiguation)
 Land Reform Ordinance (disambiguation)